John Robert Parker Ravenscroft  (30 August 1939 – 25 October 2004), known professionally as John Peel, was an English disc jockey (DJ) and radio presenter. He was the longest-serving of the original BBC Radio 1 DJs, broadcasting regularly from 1967 until his death in 2004.

Peel was one of the first broadcasters to play psychedelic rock and progressive rock records on British radio. He is widely acknowledged for promoting artists of multiple genres, including pop, dub reggae, punk rock and post-punk, electronic music and dance music, indie rock, extreme metal and British hip hop. Fellow DJ Paul Gambaccini described Peel as "the most important single person in popular music from approximately 1967 through 1978. He broke more important artists than any individual."

Peel's Radio 1 shows were notable for the regular "Peel sessions", which usually consisted of four songs recorded by an artist in the BBC's studios, often providing the first major national coverage to bands that later achieved fame. Another feature was the annual Festive Fifty countdown of his listeners' favourite records of the year.

Peel appeared on television occasionally as one of the presenters of Top of the Pops in the 1980s, and provided voice-over commentary for a number of BBC programmes. He became popular with the audience of BBC Radio 4 for his Home Truths programme, which ran from the 1990s, featuring unusual stories from listeners' domestic lives.

Early life 
John Peel was born in Heswall Nursing Home in Heswall on the Wirral Peninsula, near Liverpool, the eldest of three sons of Robert Leslie Ravenscroft, a successful cotton merchant, and his wife Joan Mary (née Swainson). He grew up in the nearby village of Burton. He was educated as a boarder at Shrewsbury School, where one of his contemporaries was future Monty Python member Michael Palin. In his posthumously published autobiography, Peel said that he was raped by an older pupil while at Shrewsbury.

Peel was an avid radio listener and record collector from an early age, beginning with music offered by the American Forces Network and Radio Luxembourg. He recalled an early desire to host a radio programme of his own "so that I could play music that I heard and wanted others to hear". His housemaster, R. H. J. Brooke, whom Peel described as "extraordinarily eccentric" and "amazingly perceptive", wrote on one of his school reports, "Perhaps it's possible that John can form some kind of nightmarish career out of his enthusiasm for unlistenable records and his delight in writing long and facetious essays."

Peel completed his national service in 1959 in the Royal Artillery as a B2 radar operator. Afterwards, Peel worked as a mill operative at Townhead Mill in Rochdale and returned each weekend to Heswall on a scooter borrowed from his sister. While in Rochdale during the week, he stayed in a bed-and-breakfast in the area of Milkstone Road and Drake Street, and developed long-term associations with the town as the years progressed.

Career

United States 
In 1960, aged 21, Peel went to the United States to work for a cotton producer who had business dealings with his father. He took a number of other jobs afterwards, including working as a travelling insurance salesman. While in Dallas, Texas, where the insurance company he worked for was based, he conversed with the presidential candidate John F. Kennedy, and his running mate Lyndon B. Johnson, who were touring the city during the 1960 election campaign, and took photographs of them. Following Kennedy's assassination in November 1963, Peel passed himself off as a reporter for the Liverpool Echo in order to attend the arraignment of Lee Harvey Oswald. He and a friend can be seen in the footage of the 22/23 November midnight press conference at the Dallas Police Department when Oswald was paraded before the media. He later phoned in the story to the Echo.

While working for the insurance company, Peel wrote programs for punched card entry for an IBM 1410 computer (which led to his entry in Who's Who noting him as a former computer programmer), and he got his first radio job working unpaid for WRR (AM) in Dallas. There, he presented the second hour of the Monday night programme Kat's Karavan, which was primarily hosted by the American singer and radio personality Jim Lowe. Following this, and as Beatlemania hit the United States, Peel was hired by the Dallas radio station KLIF as the official Beatles correspondent on the strength of his connection to Liverpool. He later worked for KOMA in Oklahoma City, Oklahoma, until 1965, when he moved to KMEN in San Bernardino, California, and used his birth name, John Ravenscroft, to present the breakfast show.

Return to Britain 
Peel returned to the UK in early 1967 and found work with the offshore pirate radio station Radio London. He was offered the midnight-to-two shift, which gradually developed into a programme, The Perfumed Garden. Some thought it was named after an erotic book that was famous at the time, though Peel claimed never to have read it. While on "Big L", he adopted the name John Peel (a name suggested by a Radio London secretary) and established himself as a distinctive radio voice.

Peel's show was an outlet for the music of the UK underground scene. He played classic blues, folk music and psychedelic rock, with an emphasis on the new music emerging from Los Angeles and San Francisco. As important as the musical content of the programme was the personal – sometimes confessional – tone of Peel's presentation, and the listener participation it engendered. Underground events he had attended during his periods of shore leave, such as the UFO Club and the 14 Hour Technicolor Dream, together with causes célèbres like the drug "busts" of the Rolling Stones and John "Hoppy" Hopkins, were discussed between records. All this was far removed from Radio London's daytime format. Listeners sent Peel letters, poems and records from their own collections, so that the programme became a vehicle for two-way communication; by the final week of Radio London, he was receiving far more mail than any other DJ on the station.

After the closure of Radio London in 1967, Peel wrote a column, The Perfumed Garden, for the underground newspaper the International Times (from autumn 1967 to mid-1969), in which he showed himself to be a committed, if critical, supporter of the ideals of the underground. A Perfumed Garden mailing list was set up by a group of keen listeners, which facilitated contacts and gave rise to numerous small-scale, local arts projects typical of the time, including the poetry magazine Sol.

BBC 

When Radio London closed on 14 August 1967, Peel joined the BBC's new music station, BBC Radio 1, which began broadcasting on 30 September 1967. Unlike Big L, Radio 1 was not a full-time station, but a hybrid of recorded music and live studio orchestras. Peel said he felt he was hired because the BBC "had no real idea what they were doing so they had to take people off the pirate ships because there wasn't anybody else". Peel presented a programme called Top Gear; at first he was obliged to share presentation duties with other DJs (Pete Drummond and Tommy Vance were among his co-hosts), but in February 1968 he was given sole charge of Top Gear. He presented the show until it ended in 1975. Peel played an eclectic mix of the music that caught his attention, which he would continue to do throughout his career.

In 1969, after hosting a trailer for a BBC programme on VD on his Night Ride programme, Peel received significant media attention because he divulged on air that he had suffered from a sexually transmitted disease earlier that year. This admission was later used in an attempt to discredit him when he appeared as a defence witness in the 1971 Oz obscenity trial.

The Night Ride programme, advertised by the BBC as an exploration of words and music, seemed to take up from where The Perfumed Garden had left off. It featured rock, folk, blues, classical and electronic music. A unique feature of the programme was the inclusion of tracks, mostly of exotic non-Western music, drawn from the BBC Sound Archive; the most popular of these were gathered on a BBC Records LP, John Peel's Archive Things (1970). Night Ride also featured poetry readings and numerous interviews with a wide range of guests, including his friends Marc Bolan, journalist and musician Mick Farren, poet Pete Roche, and singer-songwriter Bridget St John and stars such as the Byrds, the Rolling Stones, and John Lennon and Yoko Ono. The programme captured much of the creative activity of the underground scene. Its anti-establishment stance and unpredictability did not find approval with the BBC hierarchy, and it ended in September 1969 after 18 months. In his sleeve notes to the Archive Things LP Peel calls the free-form nature of Night Ride his preferred radio format. His subsequent shows featured a mixture of records and live sessions, a format that would characterise his Radio 1 programmes for the rest of his career.

Punk era 
Peel's enthusiasm for music outside the mainstream occasionally brought him into conflict with the Radio 1 hierarchy. On one occasion, the then station controller Derek Chinnery contacted John Walters and asked him to confirm that the show was not playing any punk, which he (Chinnery) had read about in the press and of which he disapproved. Chinnery was evidently somewhat surprised by Walters' reply that in recent weeks they had been playing little else.

In a 1990 interview, Peel recalled his 1976 discovery of the first album by New York punk band the Ramones as a seminal event:

In 1979, Peel stated: "They leave you to get on with it. I'm paid money by the BBC not to go off and work for a commercial radio station ... I wouldn't want to go to one anyway, because they wouldn't let me do what the BBC let me do."

Peel's reputation as an important DJ who broke unsigned acts into the mainstream was such that young hopefuls sent him an enormous number of records, CDs, and tapes. When he returned home from a three-week holiday at the end of 1986 there were 173 LPs, 91 12"s and 179 7"s waiting for him. In 1983 Alan Melina and Jeff Chegwin, the music publishers for then-unsigned artist Billy Bragg, drove to the Radio 1 studios with a mushroom biryani and a copy of his record after hearing Peel mention that he was hungry; the subsequent airplay launched Billy Bragg's career.

In addition to his Radio 1 show, Peel broadcast as a disc jockey on the BBC World Service, on the British Forces Broadcasting Service (John Peel's Music on BFBS) for 30 years, VPRO Radio3 in the Netherlands, YLE Radio Mafia in Finland, Ö3 in Austria (Nachtexpress), and on Radio 4U, Radio Eins (Peel ...), Radio Bremen (Ritz) and some independent radio stations around FSK Hamburg in Germany. As a result of his BFBS programme he was voted, in Germany, "Top DJ in Europe".

Peel was an occasional presenter of Top of the Pops on BBC1 from the late 1960s until the 1990s, and in particular from 1982 to 1987 when he appeared regularly. In 1971 he appeared not as presenter but performer, alongside Rod Stewart and the Faces, pretending to play mandolin on "Maggie May". He often presented the BBC's television coverage of music events, notably the Glastonbury Festival.

Later years 
Between 1995 and 1997, Peel presented Offspring, a show about children, on BBC Radio 4. In 1998, Offspring grew into the magazine-style documentary show Home Truths. When he took on the job presenting the programme, which was about everyday life in British families, Peel requested that it be free from celebrities, as he found real-life stories more entertaining. Home Truths was described by occasional stand-in presenter John Walters as being "about people who had fridges called Renfrewshire". Peel also made regular contributions to BBC Two's humorous look at the irritations of modern life Grumpy Old Men. His only appearances in an acting role in film or television were in Harry Enfield's Smashie and Nicey: The End of an Era as John Past Bedtime, and in 1999 as a "grumpy old man who catalogues records" in the film Five Seconds to Spare. However, he had provided narration for others.

He appeared as a celebrity guest on a number of TV shows, including This Is Your Life (1996, BBC), Travels With My Camera (1996, Channel 4 TV) and Going Home (2002, ITV TV), and presented the 1997 Channel 4 series Classic Trains. He was also in demand as a voice-over artist for television documentaries, such as BBC One's A Life of Grime.

In April 2003, the publishers Transworld successfully wooed Peel with a package worth £1.5 million for his autobiography, having placed an advert in a national newspaper aimed only at Peel. Unfinished at the time of his death, it was completed by Sheila and journalist Ryan Gilbey. It was published in October 2005 under the title Margrave of the Marshes. A collection of Peel's miscellaneous writings, The Olivetti Chronicles, was published in 2008.

Personal life

Marriages
While residing in Dallas, Texas, in 1965, he married his first wife, Shirley Anne Milburn, then aged 15, in what Peel later described as a "mutual defence pact". The marriage was never happy, with reports that Milburn was often violent towards Peel. Although she accompanied Peel back to Britain in 1967, they were soon separated. The divorce became final in 1973. Milburn later took her own life.

After separation from his first wife, Peel's personal life began to stabilise, as he found friendship and support from new Top Gear producer John Walters, and from his girlfriend Sheila Gilhooly, whom he identified on-air as "the Pig". Peel married Gilhooly on 31 August 1974. The reception was in London's Regent's Park, with Walters as best man. Peel wore Liverpool football colours (red) and walked down the aisle to the song "You'll Never Walk Alone". Their sheepdog, Woggle, served as a bridesmaid. Rock singer Rod Stewart and Monty Python member Graham Chapman both attended.

In the 1970s, Peel and Sheila moved to a thatched cottage in the village of Great Finborough near Stowmarket in Suffolk, nicknamed Peel Acres. In later years, Peel broadcast many of his shows from a studio in the house, with Sheila and their children often being involved or at least mentioned. Peel's passion for Liverpool F.C. was reflected in his children's names: William Robert Anfield, Alexandra Mary Anfield, Thomas James Dalglish, and Florence Victoria Shankly. His later shows also regularly featured live performances (broadcast live, unlike the pre-recorded Peel sessions), mostly from BBC Maida Vale Studios in West London, but occasionally in the Peel Acres living room.

Health
At the age of 62, he was diagnosed with diabetes, following many years of fatigue.

Sexual abuse accusations 
Peel has been accused of sexual abuse. His first marriage to Milburn in 1965 has been cited as an example of misconduct given her age when they wed (Peel was 25), however in Texas this was legal at the time.

To The Guardian in 1975, Peel said of young women, "All they wanted me to do was abuse them, sexually, which, of course, I was only too happy to do". In an interview with The Sunday Correspondent in 1989, Peel stated, "Girls used to queue up outside. By and large not usually for shagging. Oral sex they were particularly keen on, I remember. [...] One of my, er, regular customers, as it were, turned out to be 13, though she looked older." Peel joked that he "didn't ask for ID". An interview originally published in The Herald in April 2004 stated that Peel admitted to sexual contact with "an awful lot" of underage girls. He claimed that, in the early 1960s, the only available women were in high school.

In 2012, a woman stated that she had a three-month affair with Peel in 1969 when she was 15 years old; Peel was 30. She said they had unprotected sex; this was shortly after Peel discussed contracting a sexually transmitted disease. The relationship resulted in a "traumatic" abortion. She stated that, "looking back, it was terribly wrong and I was perhaps manipulated."

Death 
Peel died suddenly at the age of 65 from a heart attack on 25 October 2004, on a working holiday in the city of Cusco in Peru. Shortly after the announcement of his death, tributes began to arrive from fans and supporters both in public and private life. On 26 October 2004 BBC Radio 1 cleared its schedules to broadcast a day of tributes. London's Evening Standard boards that afternoon read "the day the music died", quoting Don McLean's hit "American Pie".

Peel had often spoken wryly of his eventual death. He once said on the Channel 4 miniseries Sounds of the Suburbs, "I've always imagined I'd die by driving into the back of a truck while trying to read the name on a cassette and people would say, 'He would have wanted to go that way.' Well, I want them to know that I wouldn't."

At one point, he said that if he died before his producer John Walters, he wanted the latter to play Roy Harper's "When an Old Cricketer Leaves the Crease". Walters having died in 2001, it was left to Andy Kershaw to end his tribute programme to Peel on BBC Radio 3 with the song. Peel's stand-in on his Radio 1 slot, Rob da Bank, also played the song at the start of the final show before his funeral. Another time, Peel said he would like to be remembered with a gospel song. He stated that the final record he would play would be the Rev C. L. Franklin's sermon "Dry Bones in The Valley".

On his Home Truths BBC radio show, Peel once commented about his own death:

Peel's funeral, on 12 November 2004, in Bury St Edmunds, Suffolk, was attended by over a thousand people, including many of the artists he had championed. Eulogies were read by his brother Alan Ravenscroft and DJ Paul Gambaccini. The service ended with clips of him talking about his life. His coffin was carried out to the accompaniment of his favourite song, The Undertones' "Teenage Kicks". Peel had written that, apart from his name, all he wanted on his gravestone were the words, "Teenage dreams, so hard to beat", from the lyrics of "Teenage Kicks". A headstone featuring the lyrics and the Liver Bird from his favourite football team, Liverpool FC, was placed at his grave in 2008. Peel was buried in the graveyard of St Andrew's Church in Great Finborough, Suffolk.

Life in music

Peel sessions 

John Peel Sessions were a feature of his BBC Radio 1 shows, which usually consisted of four pieces of music pre-recorded at the BBC's studios. The sessions originally came about due to restrictions imposed on the BBC by the Musicians' Union and Phonographic Performance Limited which represented the record companies dominated by the EMI cartel. Because of these restrictions, the BBC had been forced to hire bands and orchestras to render cover versions of recorded music. The theory behind this device was that it would create employment and force people to buy records and not listen to them free of charge on the air. One of the reasons why the offshore broadcasting stations of the 1960s were called "pirates" was because they operated outside of British laws and were not bound by the needle time restriction on the number of records they could play on the air.

The BBC employed its own house bands and orchestras and it also engaged outside bands to record exclusive tracks for its programmes in BBC studios. This was the reason why Peel was able to use "session men" in his own programmes. Sessions were usually four tracks recorded and mixed in a single day; as such they often had a rough-and-ready, demo-like feel, somewhere between a live performance and a finished recording. During the 37 years Peel remained on BBC Radio 1, over 4,000 sessions were recorded by over 2,000 artists. Many classic Peel Sessions have been released on record, particularly by the Strange Fruit label. In May 2020, an alphabetised catalogue of hundreds of classic Peel Sessions others had previously uploaded to YouTube was published.

Festive Fifty 

The Festive Fifty – a countdown of the best tracks of the year as voted for by the listeners – was an annual tradition of Peel's Radio 1 show. Despite his eclectic play list, it tended to be composed largely of "white boys with guitars", as Peel complained in 1988. In 1991, the broadcast of the chart was cancelled due to a lack of votes, although many have speculated that it was because no entries came from the dance acts that Peel had been championing that year. Topped by Nirvana's "Smells Like Teen Spirit", this Phantom Fifty was eventually broadcast at the rate of one track per programme in 1993. The 1997 chart was initially cancelled due to the lack of air-time Peel had been allocated for the period, but enough "spontaneous" votes were received over the phone that a Festive Thirty-One was compiled and broadcast.

Peel wrote that "The Festive 50 dates back to what was doubtless a crisp September morning in the early-to-mid Seventies, when John Walters and I were musing on life in his uniquely squalid office. In our waggish way, we decided to mock the enthusiasm of the Radio 1 management of the time for programmes with alliterative titles. Content, we felt, was of less importance than a snappy Radio Times billing. In the course of our historic meeting we had, I imagine, some fine reasons for dismissing the idea of a Festive 40 and going instead for a Festive 50, a decision that was to ruin my Decembers for years to come, condemning me to night after night at home with a ledger, when I could have been out and about having fun, fun, fun."

After his death, the Festive Fifty was continued on Radio 1 by Rob da Bank, Huw Stephens and Ras Kwame for two years, but then given to Peel-inspired Internet radio station Dandelion Radio, and continues to be compiled.

Dandelion Records and Strange Fruit 
In 1969, Peel founded Dandelion Records (named after his pet hamster) so that he could release the debut album by Bridget St John, which he also produced. The label released 27 albums by 18 different artists before folding in 1972. Of its albums, There is Some Fun Going Forward was a sampler intended to present its acts to a wide audience, but Dandelion was never a great success, with only two releases charting nationally: Medicine Head in the UK with "(And the) Pictures in the Sky" and Beau in Lebanon with "1917 Revolution". Having had an affinity with the Manchester area from working in a cotton mill in Rochdale in 1959, Peel signed Manchester bands Stack Waddy and Tractor to Dandelion and was always supportive of both bands throughout his life. It is alleged that Peel spotted a Rochdale postmark on the envelope containing the tape sent to him by Tractor, then called "The Way We Live".

As Peel stated:

It was never a success financially. In fact, we lost money, if I remember correctly, on every single release bar one. I did quite like it but it was terribly indulgent. Not as indulgent as it would have been had I not had a business partner, admittedly... I liked having a label. It enabled you to put out stuff that you liked without, in those days, having to worry about whether it was going to work commercially. I've never been a good business man.

Peel appeared on one Dandelion release: the David Bedford album Nurses Song with Elephants, recorded at the Marquee Studios, as part of a group playing twenty-seven plastic pipe twirlers on the track "Some Bright Stars for Queen's College".

In the 1980s Peel set up Strange Fruit Records with Clive Selwood to release material recorded by the BBC for Peel Sessions.

Production (albums) 
 1969: Mike Hart Bleeds – Mike Hart
 1969: The Year of the Great Leap Sideways – Occasional Word Ensemble
 1969: Soundtrack – Principal Edwards Magic Theatre
 1970: New Bottles Old Medicine – Medicine Head
 1970: Burnin' Red Ivanhoe – Burnin' Red Ivanhoe (co-produced w/ Tony Reeves)
 1970: The Asmoto Running Band – Principal Edwards Magic Theatre
 1972: Bugger Off! – Stack Waddy

John Peel is sometimes confused with the more prolific record producer Jonathan Peel, who was an in-house music producer for EMI before going freelance in 1970.

Favourite music 
John Peel wrote in his autobiography, Margrave of the Marshes, that the band of which he owned the most records was The Fall. Regulars in the Festive 50, and easily recognised by vocalist Mark E. Smith's distinctive delivery, The Fall became synonymous with Peel's Radio 1 show through the 1980s and 1990s. Peel kept in contact with many of the artists he championed but only met Smith on two, apparently awkward, occasions.

The Misunderstood is the only band that Peel ever personally managed – he first met the band in Riverside, California in 1966 and convinced them to move to London. He championed their music throughout his career; in 1968, he described their 1966 single "I Can Take You to the Sun" as "the best popular record that's ever been recorded." and shortly before his death, he stated, "If I had to list the ten greatest performances I've seen in my life, one would be The Misunderstood at Pandora's Box, Hollywood, 1966 ... My god, they were a great band!"

His favourite single is widely known to have been "Teenage Kicks" by The Undertones; in an interview in 2001, he stated "There's nothing you could add to it or subtract from it that would improve it." In the same 2001 interview, he also listed "No More Ghettos in America" by Stanley Winston, "There Must Be Thousands" by The Quads and "Lonely Saturday Night" by Don French as being among his all-time favourites. He also described Lianne Hall as one of the great English voices.

In 1997 The Guardian asked Peel to list his top 20 albums. He listed Captain Beefheart's Trout Mask Replica as his number 1, having previously described it as "a work of art". The top 20 also included LPs by The Velvet Underground, The Ramones, Pulp, Misty in Roots, Nirvana, Neil Young, Pink Floyd, The Four Brothers, Dave Clarke, Richard and Linda Thompson and The Rolling Stones.

A longer list of his favourite singles was revealed in 2005 when the contents of a wooden box in which he stored the records that meant the most to him were made public. The box was the subject of a television documentary, John Peel's Record Box. Out of 130 vinyl singles in the box, 11 of them were by The White Stripes, more than any other band in the box.

In 1999 Peel presented a nightly segment on his programme titled the Peelennium, in which he played four recordings from each year of the 20th century.

Awards and honorary degrees 
Peel was 11 times Melody Maker′s DJ of the year, Sony Broadcaster of the Year in 1993, winner of the publicly voted Godlike Genius Award from the NME in 1994, Sony Gold Award winner in 2002 and is a member of the Radio Academy Hall of Fame. At the NME awards in 2005, he was Hero of the Year and was posthumously given a special award for "Lifelong Service To Music". At the same event the "John Peel Award For Musical Innovation" was awarded to The Others.

He was awarded many honorary degrees including an MA from the University of East Anglia, doctorates (Anglia Polytechnic University and Sheffield Hallam University), various degrees (University of Liverpool, Open University, University of Portsmouth, University of Bradford) and a fellowship of Liverpool John Moores University.

He was appointed an OBE in 1998, for his services to British music. In 2002, the BBC conducted a vote to discover the 100 Greatest Britons of all time, in which Peel was voted 43rd.

Various shows

Legacy 
Since his death various parties have recognised Peel's influence. A stage for new bands at the Glastonbury Festival, previously known as "The New Bands Tent" was renamed "The John Peel Stage" in 2005, while in 2008 Merseytravel announced it would be naming a train after him.

The John Peel Centre for Creative Arts opened in Stowmarket in early 2013. The main purposes of the centre is to serve as a live venue for music and performance and as a community meeting point.

The 2005 Mogwai live compilation album Government Commissions: BBC Sessions 1996–2003 was dedicated to Peel as some of the tracks had been performed during the Peel Sessions. Peel's voice announces "Ladies and Gentlemen, Mogwai!" at the beginning of "Hunted by a Freak", the album's opener.

On 8 October 2005 Cotswold Rail locomotive 47813 was named John Peel by Peel's widow Shelia at Bury St Edmunds station.

On 13 October 2005, the first "John Peel Day" was held to mark the anniversary of his last show. The BBC encouraged as many bands as possible to stage gigs on the 13th, and over 500 gigs took place in the UK and as far away as Canada and New Zealand, from bands ranging from Peel favourites New Order and The Fall, to many new and unsigned bands. A second John Peel day was held on 12 October 2006, and a third on 11 October 2007. The BBC had originally planned to hold a John Peel Day annually, but Radio 1 has not held any official commemoration of the event since 2007, though gigs still took place around the country to mark the anniversary for a number of years afterwards.

At the annual Gilles Peterson's Worldwide Awards, the "John Peel Play More Jazz Award" was named in his honour.

In Peel's hometown of Heswall, a pub was opened in his honour in 2007. Named The Ravenscroft, the pub was converted from the old Heswall Telephone Exchange  but has since been renamed.

In 2012 Peel was among the British cultural icons selected by artist Sir Peter Blake to appear in a new version of his most famous artwork – the Beatles' Sgt. Pepper's Lonely Hearts Club Band album cover.

Several Peel-related compilation albums have been released since his death, including John Peel and Sheila: The Pig's Big 78s: A Beginner's Guide, a project Peel started with his wife that was left unfinished when he died, and Kats Karavan: The History of John Peel on the Radio (2009), a 4 CD box set. Rock music critic Peter Paphides said in a review of the box set that "[s]ome artists remain forever associated with him", including ...And the Native Hipsters with "There Goes Concorde Again", and Ivor Cutler with "Jam". A sizable online community has also emerged dedicated to sharing recordings of his radio shows.

In May 2012 a campaign was started to turn demolition-threatened Bradford Odeon into the John Peel Creative Arts Centre in the North, though this was ultimately unsuccessful.

In July 2022 a petition was launched to rename the "John Peel Stage" at the Glastonbury Festival due to the sexual abuse Peel was accused of and admitted to.

Blue plaques 
In 2009 blue plaques bearing Peel's name were unveiled at two former recording studios in Rochdale – one at the site of Tractor Sound Studios in Heywood, the other at the site of the Kenion Street Music Building – to recognise Peel's contribution to the local music industry.

In June 2017 Peel's widow Sheila unveiled a blue plaque in his honour in Great Finborough.

See also 
 List of Peel sessions
 Alan Bangs

References

Bibliography

Further reading 
 Margrave of the Marshes, Autobiography with Sheila Ravenscroft, Bantam Press, 2005. 
 The Olivetti Chronicles. Articles for The Observer, Radio Times, The Guardian a.o., selected by his wife Sheila and their children. Bantam Press 2008. 
 Good Night and Good Riddance: How Thirty-Five Years of John Peel Helped to Shape Modern Life, David Cavanagh, Faber & Faber, 2015,

External links 

BBC – Radio 1 – Keeping It Peel
Archived BBC – Radio 1 – John Peel
BBC John Peel Biography (PDF)
John Peel Archive Project
John Peel Everyday
John Peel on Desert Island Discs

 
1939 births
2004 deaths
20th-century British Army personnel
BBC World Service people
British music history
BBC Radio 1 presenters
Burials in Suffolk
English expatriates in the United States
English radio personalities
English male voice actors
Glastonbury Festival
Officers of the Order of the British Empire
Offshore radio broadcasters
People educated at Shrewsbury School
People from Heswall
People from Great Finborough
Pirate radio personalities
Royal Artillery soldiers
Record collectors
Top of the Pops presenters